Claire Armstrong is a British amateur astronomer. She is married to supernova hunter Mark Armstrong, and both work from Rolvenden (IAU code 960), Kent, England. The asteroid 15967 Clairearmstrong was named in her honour by its discoverer, her husband.

References

Year of birth missing (living people)
20th-century British astronomers
21st-century British astronomers
Women astronomers
Discoverers of asteroids
People from Rolvenden
Living people